Öjersjö is a locality situated in Partille Municipality, Västra Götaland County, Sweden with 3,543 inhabitants in 2010.

References 

Populated places in Västra Götaland County
Populated places in Partille Municipality